Jaroslav Volf (8 August 1933 – 13 December 1990) was a Czech ice hockey player. He competed in the men's tournament at the 1960 Winter Olympics.

References

External links
 

1933 births
1990 deaths
Czech ice hockey forwards
Olympic ice hockey players of Czechoslovakia
Ice hockey players at the 1960 Winter Olympics
Sportspeople from Kladno
Rytíři Kladno players
Czechoslovak ice hockey coaches
Czechoslovak ice hockey forwards